"Think I'm in Love" is a song by Beck from his seventh major-label studio album, The Information. It was issued as the third single from the album. The single charted at number 22 on the Billboard Modern Rock Tracks chart and number 2 on the Adult Alternative Songs chart.

External links

2006 singles
Beck songs
Song recordings produced by Nigel Godrich
Songs written by Beck
2006 songs
Interscope Records singles